Arzhanovskaya is a rural locality (a stanitsa) and the administrative center of Arzhanovskoye Rural Settlement, Alexeyevsky District, Volgograd Oblast, Russia. The population was 772 as of 2010.

Geography 
Arzhanovskaya is located on the plain between Khopyor River and hills, 36 km southeast of Alexeyevskaya (the district's administrative centre) by road. Zotovskaya is the nearest rural locality.

References 

Rural localities in Alexeyevsky District, Volgograd Oblast
Don Host Oblast